Andrew J. Andrist (born August 19, 1965) is an American stand-up comedian and former writer for Comedy Central's The Man Show.

Stand-Up

Andrist is also one of the original members of Doug Stanhope's comedy group known as The Unbookables. Other members of the Unbookables include Sean Rouse, Henry Phillips, Otto & George, Tom Rhodes, Auggie Smith, Lynn Shawcroft, Neil Hamburger, Travis Lipski, Brendon Walsh, Joey Diaz, Kristine Levine, Brett Erickson, and others.

Discography

Both Andrist's debut CD Dumb It Down for the Masses and follow-up benefit CD Morbid Obscenity with fellow Unbookables Doug Stanhope, Sean Rouse, and Lynn Shawcroft was recorded and put out by Dan Schlissel's Stand Up! Records. Last Shot was released in June 2021.

Television appearances

Following the departure of Jimmy Kimmel and Adam Carolla from Comedy Central's The Man Show in 2003, Andrist was hired as a writer and performer alongside comedians Doug Stanhope and Joe Rogan.

In May 2008, Andrist filmed a set for an episode of HBO's Down and Dirty with Jim Norton. The four-part special features young comedians as well as several established headliners, including Artie Lange, Patrice O'Neal, Andrew 'Dice' Clay, Bill Burr, Jim Florentine, Ari Shaffir, and fellow Unbookable Sean Rouse among others.

Personal life

In late 2021, Andrist was diagnosed with bile duct cancer. The news was announced on 'The Doug Stanhope Podcast Episode #475 - Andy's Got Cancer'. He underwent surgery in January 2022.  Results were successful.

References

External links 

 The Morbid Obscenity website
 Dead Frog article "Morbid Obscenity: A Benefit from Comics Who Don't Care"
 Stage Time review of Morbid Obscenity
 Stand Up! Records
 The Unbookables' official website
 The Doug Stanhope Podcast
 

Writers from Eugene, Oregon
Living people
1965 births
Comedians from Oregon
People from Coquille, Oregon
21st-century American comedians
Stand Up! Records artists